Krinichnoye is a rural locality (a khutor) in Volokonovsky District, Belgorod Oblast, Russia. The population was 42 as of 2010. There is 1 street.

Geography 
Krinichnoye is located 9 km southwest of Volokonovka (the district's administrative centre) by road.

References 

Rural localities in Volokonovsky District